Soung Chang Liew is a Hong Kong professor of information engineering. He worked at Bellcore in New Jersey from 1988 to 1993 before joining the Chinese University of Hong Kong faculty in 1993. He was named Fellow of the Institute of Electrical and Electronics Engineers (IEEE) in 2012 "for contributions to wireless communications and networking".

References

External links 
Faculty page at the Department of Information Engineering, Chinese University of Hong Kong

Fellow Members of the IEEE
Massachusetts Institute of Technology alumni
Living people
Year of birth missing (living people)